Tahir Khan Nahar (or Tahar Khan Nahar) also known as ‘Sakhi’ (generous or liberal)  was chief of his independent kingdom in Seet pur. In 1455 A.D. Bahlul Lodi gave a large treaty to his relative Islam Khan Lodhi. He adopted the title Nahar. Tahir Khan Nahar was the grandson of Islam Khan Nahar. Tahir Khan Nahar is very famous for his tomb. He constructed his tomb in his lifetime in around 1530. This tomb is included in cultural heritage sites in Muzaffargarh and protected by protected by the Federal Government of Pakistan.

See also 
 Tomb of Tahir Khan Nahar

References 

Muzaffargarh
People from Muzaffargarh District
People from Muzaffargarh